Fardaq (also Romanized as Fārdaq; also known as Jalālābād, Jalīlābād, and Fārūq) is a village in Roshtkhar Rural District, in the Central District of Roshtkhar County, Razavi Khorasan Province, Iran. At the 2006 census, its population was 663, in 158 families.

References 

Populated places in Roshtkhar County